The 1984 Danish 1st Division season was the 39th season of the Danish 1st Division league championship, governed by the Danish Football Association. It constituted the 71st edition of the Danish football championship, and saw Vejle Boldklub win their fifth championship title.

The Danish champions qualified for the European Cup 1985-86 qualification, whilst the second placed team qualified for the qualification round of the UEFA Cup 1985-86. The three lowest placed teams of the tournament was directly relegated to the Danish 2nd Division for the following season. Likewise, the Danish 2nd Division champions and two first runners-up were promoted to the 1st Division.

Table

Results

Top goalscorers

External links
 Peders Fodboldstatistik
 Haslund.info

Danish 1st Division seasons
Dan
Dan
1
Top level Danish football league seasons